Ernest Leighton Jones (26 November 1871 – 12 December 1959) was an Australian rules footballer who played with St Kilda in the Victorian Football League (VFL).

He later served as president of St Kilda Football Club and as a Melbourne city councillor for over twenty years.

References

External links 

1871 births
1959 deaths
Australian rules footballers from Melbourne
St Kilda Football Club players
People from Carlton, Victoria
St Kilda Football Club administrators
Victoria (Australia) local councillors
Politicians from Melbourne
20th-century Australian politicians
Australian sportsperson-politicians